Mount Montreuil is a mountain,  high, along the north side of Gair Glacier  east of Mount Supernal, in the Mountaineer Range of Victoria Land, Antarctica. It was mapped by the United States Geological Survey from surveys and U.S. Navy air photos, 1960–64, and was named by the Advisory Committee on Antarctic Names for Paul L. Montreuil, a biologist at McMurdo Station in 1964–65.

References

Mountains of Victoria Land
Mountaineer Range
Borchgrevink Coast